Aagaard or Ågård is a surname. Notable people with the surname include:

 Carl Frederik Aagaard (1833–1895), Danish landscape painter
 Christen Aagaard (1616–1664), Danish poet
 Gudrun Stig Aagaard (1895–1986), Danish textile artist
 Jacob Aagaard (born 1973), Scottish chess grandmaster
 Jane Aagaard (born 1956), Australian politician
 Johannes Aagaard (1928–2007), Danish theologian and evangelist
 Julie Aagaard (born 1992), Danish handball player
 Just Michael Aagaard (1757–1819), Danish merchant
 Kari Aagaard, Norwegian handball player
 Martin Aagaard (1863–1913), Norwegian painter
 Mikkel Aagaard (born 1995), Danish ice hockey player
 Niels Aagaard (1612–1657), Danish scholar
 Robert Aagaard (1932–2001), English youth movement founder
 Rolf M. Aagaard (born 1945), Norwegian photographer
 Thorvald Aagaard (1877–1937), Danish composer and organist
 Torstein Aagaard-Nilsen (born 1964), Norwegian composer
 Gunnar Aagaard Andersen (1919–1982), Danish artist
 Andreas Aagaard Kiønig (1771–1856), Norwegian judge
 Ole Rømer Aagaard Sandberg (1888–1975), Norwegian military officer
 Ole Rømer Aagaard Sandberg (1900–1985), Norwegian politician
 Bjarne Aagaard Strøm (1920–2008), Norwegian newspaper editor

See also 
 Douglas C. Aagard (born 1954), American politician from Utah
 Julie Dahle Aagård (born 1978), Norwegian jazz musician
 Olaf Aagard, owner of the Aagard Lumber Company in Oregon
 Aagaard Islands in the Southern Ocean near the coast of Antarctica
 Aagaard Glacier in Graham Land, Antarctica

References 

Surnames of Danish origin